The Final Circle of Paradise is a science fiction novel by Arkady and Boris Strugatsky (also spelled Strugatski or Strugatskii) set in the first half of the 21st century.  It was first published in the USSR in 1965 and the first English edition, translated by Leonid Renen, was published by DAW books in 1976.  The literal English translation of the original Russian title is "Predatory Things of Our Times". This is a line from Andrei Voznesensky's poem Beatnik's Monologue. Machine Riot (1961).

This novel is a sequel of sorts to an earlier Strugatsky novel Space Apprentice (1962).  At the end of Space Apprentice, flight engineer Ivan Zhilin gives up space travel for Earth – where "the most important things are" – to make the solar system a better place for the young people of the world.  The Final Circle of Paradise takes place a little less than ten years after Space Apprentice, in a medium-sized seaside resort city somewhere in Europe.  In the intervening time, he has been working for the security service of the World Council, an international governing body similar to but far more powerful than the United Nations.  A few years before, Zhilin fought as part of an international brigade to put down a Fascist uprising in the same city where this story is set, reminiscent of the Soviet experience during the Second World War.  This was supposedly one of the "final" wars before universal disarmament, where the last of the fascists were finally defeated.  Like other Strugatsky novels, the setting is an internationalized future of advanced technology and world peace.  There is no iron curtain, cold war, or arms race.  Most of the world is permanently at peace, with the rest on the verge of being forcibly demilitarized.

Plot summary
Ivan Zhilin, posing as a writer working on a novel, visits a seaside resort city to investigate a series of mysterious deaths.  Zhilin's role as an undercover agent becomes apparent to the reader only gradually and is not brought into the open until the final chapters of the novel.

While being given a tour of the city, a tourism official tells Zhilin that he will get no work done, as he will be distracted by the "twelve circles of paradise" found in the city.  These include the Fishers, which provide thrill seekers with situations of extreme and potentially fatal terror, the Shivers, which electronically induce pleasurable dreams to large crowds of people, and the Society of Patrons of Arts, who procure priceless works of art and ritualistically destroy them.  The culture of this city has become utterly decadent, the product of an age of universal affluence.  Zhilin refers to it as "the age of plenty" where the highest priority is placed on orgiastic pleasure and staving off boredom, to the neglect of culture, education and scientific progress.  This Marxist perspective is expressed in a scene of Zhilin's scolding rebuke directed at a third-world rebel leader "revolutionary" who professes his amazement by and envy of the city's opulence while gorging himself in an eatery:

The ultimate expression of the decadence of the city's culture is the mysterious "slug", which is apparently responsible for the deaths that Zhilin is investigating.   At first Zhilin believes it to be some sort of narcotic, distributed by gangsters with secret laboratories and trafficking networks.  Zhilin progressively finds clues that lead him to Peck Xenai, his former classmate and the last surviving member of his international unit that fought the Fascists some years before.  Peck, however, is physically ravaged by alcoholism and the use of "slug" and does not even recognize Zhilin when he finds him.  Zhilin succeeds in getting a "slug" from Peck, in the form of a small silver electronic component.  What Zhilin finds when he plugs the "slug" into his radio receiver and lies in the bathtub causes him to rethink the entire situation.

"Slug" turns out to be a way of generating an artificial reality significantly more intense than normal reality, to the point where there is virtually no comparison between our reality and that of the "slug".  People become addicted to it and spend increasing amounts of time unconscious in their bathtubs until it kills them by nervous exhaustion or brain hemorrhages.  This is "the final circle of paradise". It also turns out that the "slug" is not the work of gangsters or a secret laboratory, but is a common electronic component being used in a novel way.  If "slug" were to become widely known, Zhilin concludes, nothing would stop it from being used by millions the world over.  Zhilin, himself struggling not to use it a second time, concludes that "slug" represents "the end of progress".  He foresees humanity as a whole entering this illusory reality, which will eventually destroy mankind.

At the end of Space Apprentice, Zhilin began to devote his life to making the solar system a better place for young people struggling to find purpose in the world.  At the end of this story, he leaves his work with the World Council to fight "the last war – the most bloodless and most difficult for its soldiers" (p. 170) – that of making life worth living for the millions caught unprepared in an age of affluence, so that they will never need anything like "slug".  However, even as Zhilin is saying this, at the end of the novel it is left ambiguous whether he thinks he will be able to resist using the "slug" again.

References

1965 novels
1965 in the Soviet Union
1965 science fiction novels
Novels by Arkady and Boris Strugatsky
DAW Books books
Social science fiction